Anderup is a village and northern suburb of Odense, Funen, Denmark.

References

Suburbs of Odense
Populated places in Funen